Johanna Francisca Theodora Maria "José" van Dijck (born 15 November 1960, in Boxtel) is a new media author and a distinguished university professor in media and digital society at Utrecht University since 2017. From 2001 to 2016 she was a professor of Comparative Media Studies where she was the former chair of the Department of Media Studies and former dean of the Faculty of Humanities at the University of Amsterdam. She is the author of ten (co-)authored and (co-)edited books including Mediated Memory in the Digital Age; The Culture of Connectivity.; and The Platform Society. Public Values in a Connective World. Her work has been translated into many languages and distributed to a worldwide audience.

Since 2010 Van Dijck has been a member of the Royal Netherlands Academy of Arts and Sciences. In 2015 she was elected by Academy members as the president of the organisation and became the first woman to hold the position.

In 2016 Dutch magazine Opzij named Van Dijck the most influential Dutch woman of 2016.

In 2019 Lund University awarded Van Dijick an honorary doctorate for her scientific merits and contributions to the social aspects of digitalisation.

Early life and education 
Johanna Francisca Theodora Maria van Dijck was born in Boxtel, Netherlands.

She attended and graduated from Utrecht University with a BA and MA in 1985. She later graduated with a Ph.D of Comparative Literature at the University of California, San Diego in 1992.

Notable works 
Van Dijck published her first book Manufacturing Babies and Public Consent: Debating the New Reproductive Technologies in 1995. It talks about the growing discussions from activists and scholars regarding the new developments of technology involving reproductivity. Van Dijck draws from scientific articles, fiction and studies to reconstruct the debate.

Other notable works include Users like you? Theorizing agency in user-generated content which focuses on the idea of "you" which is a metaphor for the millions of anonymous contributors to the web as well as how this existence affects the generation and circulation of content. In her article, Van Dijck argues for the articulation of user agency as a complex concept which involves not only the facilitation of engagement and participation, but the economic value of both the consumer and provider, something she believes major composite site companies such as Google should attempt to create models to understand.

Publications (selected)
 José van Dijck, J. (2009). Users like you? Theorizing agency in user-generated content. Media, Culture & Society, 31(1), pp. 41–58. 10.1177/0163443708098245
 José van Dijck, Thomas Poell & Martijn de Waal, The Platform Society. Public Values in a Connective World. Oxford University Press, 2018. 
 José van Dijck: The Culture of Connectivity: A critical history of social media. New York, Oxford University Press, 2013. 
 Sound souvenirs. Audio technologies, memory and cultural practices. Edited by Karin Bijsterveld & José van Dijck. Amsterdam, Amsterdam University Press, 2009. 
 José van Dijck: Mediated memories in the digital age. Stanford, CA. Stanford University Press, 2007. 
 José van Dijck: The transparent body. A cultural analysis of medical imaging. Seattle, University of Washington Press, 2005. 
 José van Dijck: Manufacturing Babies and Public Consent. Debating the New Reproductive Technologies. New York: New York University Press, 1995. 
 José van Dijck: Discontinuous discourses. Mapping the public debate on new reproductive technologies, 1978-1991. Thesis (Ph. D.),  University of California, San Diego, Department of Literature, 1992. No ISBN
 José van Dijck: 'Profile, University of Amsterdam' https://www.hiig.de/en/jose-van-dijck/

See also 
 Connectivity of social media

References

Utrecht University staff page

1960 births
Living people
Dutch mass media scholars
Digital media educators
Members of the Royal Netherlands Academy of Arts and Sciences
University of California, San Diego alumni
Academic staff of Utrecht University
People from Boxtel
21st-century Dutch women writers